Everybody Has Secrets is a 2004 South Korean romantic comedy film. It stars Lee Byung-hun, Choi Ji-woo, Kim Hyo-jin and Chu Sang-mi. Because it has several sex-scenes, it is generally restricted to viewers under 18 or 21. Although the film wasn't a particularly big hit in South Korea it grossed $4,888,679 in Japan.

Synopsis 
Han Mi-yeong meets Choi Su-hyeon and falls in love with him.  However, unknown to her, he also begins to seduce her two sisters Han Seon-yeong and Han Ji-yeong.  The two sisters are captivated by him and are unable to resist him.

Cast 
 Lee Byung-hun as Choi Su-hyeon
 Choi Ji-woo as Han Seon-yeong
 Chu Sang-mi as Han Ji-yeong
 Kim Hyo-jin as Han Mi-yeong
 Sunwoo Yong-nyeo as Mother
 Shin Yi as Woman who is about to break up
 Kim Hye-gon as Ji-yeong's husband
 Jeon Jae-hyeong as Han Dae-yeong
 Tak Jae-hoon as Sang-il

Awards and nominations
2004 Blue Dragon Film Awards
 Nomination - Best Supporting Actress - Chu Sang-mi
 Nomination - Best New Actress - Kim Hyo-jin

2005 Grand Bell Awards
 Nomination - Best Adapted Screenplay - KIM Hee-Jae

2004 Korean Film Awards
 Nomination - Best New Actress - Kim Hyo-jin

References

External links 
 
 

2004 films
2004 romantic comedy films
South Korean romantic comedy films
Adultery in films
Cinema Service films
2000s Korean-language films
2000s South Korean films